Niederahr is an Ortsgemeinde – a community belonging to a Verbandsgemeinde – in the Westerwaldkreis in Rhineland-Palatinate, Germany.

Geography

The community lies in the Westerwald between Montabaur and Hachenburg. Through the community flows the Ahrbach. The community belongs to the Verbandsgemeinde of Wallmerod, a kind of collective municipality. Its seat is in the like-named town.

History
In 959, Niederahr had its first documentary mention.

Politics

The municipal council is made up of 12 council members who were elected in a majority vote in a municipal election on 13 June 2004.

Economy and infrastructure

Transport
Right through the community runs Bundesstraße 255, linking Montabaur and Rennerod. The nearest Autobahn interchange is Montabaur on the A 3 (Cologne–Frankfurt), some 5 km away. The nearest InterCityExpress stop is the railway station at Montabaur on the Cologne-Frankfurt high-speed rail line.

Established businesses
Westfalia Separator makes decanters at its Niederahr works.

References

External links
 Niederahr 

Municipalities in Rhineland-Palatinate
Westerwaldkreis